Duncan Branch is a stream in Cass County in the U.S. state of Missouri.

Duncan Branch has the name of James L. Duncan, a pioneer settler.

See also
List of rivers of Missouri

References

Rivers of Cass County, Missouri
Rivers of Missouri